Badminton competitions at the 2019 Pan American Games in Lima, Peru were held between July 29 and August 2, 2019 at the Polideportivo 3, which also hosted the roller sports (artistic) and table tennis competitions.

Five medal events were contested: singles and doubles for men and women and a mixed doubles event. A total of 88 athletes from 22 nations competed. A total of five NOC's won medals.

The event awarded ranking points towards selection for the 2020 Summer Olympics in Tokyo, Japan.

Medal table

Medalists

Participating nations
A total of 22 countries qualified athletes. The number of athletes a nation entered is in parentheses beside the name of the country. Bolivia, Colombia, Costa Rica and Panama all made their sport debuts at the Pan American Games.

Qualification

A total of 88 badminton athletes qualified compete. Each nation may enter a maximum of 8 athletes (four per gender). As host nation, Peru automatically qualified a full team of eights athletes. All other quotas were awarded through the team world rankings as of February 28, 2019. Each nation's highest ranked athlete/pair's points in each of the five events were added to determine a country's point total.

See also
Badminton at the 2019 Parapan American Games
Badminton at the 2020 Summer Olympics

References

External links
Results book

 
Events at the 2019 Pan American Games
Pan American Games
2019
Badminton tournaments in Peru